Ken Feltscheer (9 June 1915 – 25 December 2017) was an Australian rules footballer who played with Melbourne and Hawthorn in the Victorian Football League (VFL). He turned 100 in June 2015 and died on 25 December 2017 at the age of 102.

Feltscheer grew up on a dairy farm near Neerim South, and playing under big brother Eric's captaincy  he kicked 10 goals one afternoon. That got him noticed by Moe who were in the Central Gippsland FL at the time.  He kicked ten goals on debut  then  got interested in him. After an invitation by letter he moved to the city. He played in two reserves premierships under seconds coach "Bull" Adams.

Melbourne were interested in former Hawthorn Fullback Bert Chandler, who had returned from Western Australia. Feltscheer and fellow teammate Gordon Waters were part of a player swap for Chandler in 1937.

Feltscheer retired from league football at the end of 1940 but was talked into helping out because of wartime player shortage by playing 5 games in 1943.

See also
 List of centenarians (sportspeople)

References

External links 		

1915 births
2017 deaths
Australian rules footballers from Victoria (Australia)		
Melbourne Football Club players		
Hawthorn Football Club players
Australian centenarians
Men centenarians
Moe Football Club players